CCAS may refer to:

Center for Contemporary Arab Studies
Cerebellar Cognitive Affective Syndrome
Columbian College of Arts and Sciences, the liberal arts and sciences college of The George Washington University
Committee of Concerned Asian Scholars
Consejo Coordinador Argentino Sindical
Council of Colleges of Arts and Sciences